The German Flying Laptop satellite, launched in 2017, hosts the OSIRISv1 laser communications experiment. Total satellite mass of 110 kg.

The satellite is part of the Stuttgart Small Satellite Program, of the German Space Agency.

Optical communications tests have been carried out with ground stations in Japan, Europe, and Canada. Up to 200 Mbps data rate, from orbit to ground only. 

The two fixed lasers of OSIRISv1 are aimed at ground stations by 'body pointing', attitude control of the entire satellite, using four reaction wheels. The reaction wheels can be desaturated using three internal magnetorquers.

Further reading 
 OSIRISv1 on Flying Laptop: Measurement Results and Outlook Fuchs 2019

See also 
 Laser communication in space

References 

Satellites_of_Germany